Night hag may refer to:

Night hag or night-mare, a folkloristic explanation of sleep paralysis
Nocnitsa, a nightmare spirit in Slavic mythology
Lilith, a monster in Jewish mythology
Night hag (Dungeons & Dragons)
the Night Hag (Neverwinter Nights)
Night Hag, a track from the Earth Rocker album by Clutch